Samuel Herbert Fisher (May 26, 1867 – 1957) was an American attorney and print historian. He was a member of the Acorn Club, to which he was elected in 1933. Fisher was a fellow of the Yale Corporation (1920–1935) and chaired the Connecticut Tercentenary Commission. He received honorary degrees from Yale University, Colgate University, and Wesleyan University.

Works 
The Publications of Thomas Collier Printer 1784-1808 (Litchfield: Litchfield Historical Society, 1933)

References

External links 

 Samuel Herbert Fisher on Find a Grave
 Samuel Herbert Fisher finding aid at Yale University

1867 births
1957 deaths
Yale University faculty